Johnstown & Hafod was a minor station on the Great Western Railway's London to Birkenhead main line. Although the station is gone the railway is still open today as part of the Shrewsbury to Chester Line. The station was situated on the extreme east side of Johnstown and served both there and the adjoining settlement of Rhosllannerchrugog (pron: Ross-thlanner-kri-gog) in Wales.

Historical services
Express trains did not call at Johnstown & Hafod and the station would only have been served by West Midlands & Shrewsbury to Wrexham & Chester local trains. There were once sidings serving Hafod brickworks and Hafod colliery.

Re-opening plan
According to the Scott Wilson Report compiled for the Chester to Shrewsbury Rail Partnership, Johnstown is one of the most promising sites on the line for the re-opening of the station. (The report can be downloaded from the Chester to Shrewsbury Rail Partnership website link below).

Neighbouring stations

References

Further reading

External links
 Johnstown & Hafod station on navigable 1946 O.S. map
 Chester to Shrewsbury Rail Partnership

Disused railway stations in Wrexham County Borough
Former Great Western Railway stations
Railway stations in Great Britain opened in 1896
Railway stations in Great Britain closed in 1960